María José Ribera (born 28 October 1996) is a Bolivian swimmer. She competed in the women's 50 metre backstroke event at the 2017 World Aquatics Championships.

References

External links
 

1996 births
Living people
Bolivian female swimmers
Place of birth missing (living people)
Swimmers at the 2014 Summer Youth Olympics
Female backstroke swimmers
21st-century Bolivian women